Firoja Begum Chino is a Bangladesh Awami League politician and the former Member of Bangladesh Parliament from a reserved seat.

Early life
Chino was born on 23 February 1961 and she has a S.S.C. degree.

Career
Chino was elected to parliament from reserved seat as a Bangladesh Awami League candidate in 2014.

References

Awami League politicians
Living people
1961 births
Women members of the Jatiya Sangsad
10th Jatiya Sangsad members
21st-century Bangladeshi women politicians
21st-century Bangladeshi politicians